Frank Frost Abbott (March 27, 1860 – July 23, 1924) was an American classical scholar.

Life
Born in Redding, Connecticut, he taught at the University of Chicago, then moved to Princeton University in 1907. He died in Montreux, Switzerland.

Works

 A History and Description of Roman Political Institutions (1901).
 A Short History of Rome (1906)
 Society and Politics in Ancient Rome (1909).
 The Common People of Ancient Rome (1911).
 Roman Politics (1923).
 Municipal Administration in the Roman Empire (1926).
 Emperors and Usurpers (2017)
He also translated Alberico Gentili's Hispanicae Advocationis Libri Dvo ("Two Books of Advocacy in the Service of Spain").

References

External links
 
 
 

American classical scholars
1860 births
1924 deaths
Classical scholars of the University of Chicago
Classical scholars of Princeton University
People from Redding, Connecticut
Historians of ancient Rome